Mawrdew Czgowchwz is the debut novel of American writer James McCourt first published in 1975 by Farrar, Straus & Giroux. After falling out of print it was reprinted in a slightly revised form in 2002 by NYRB Classics.

The novel follows the cult around an opera singer called Mawrdew Czgowchwz, pronounced Mardu Gorgeous. Mawrdew was loosely based on real life opera singer  Miliza Korjus.

McCourt continued to write various works about Mawrdew Czgowchwz after publication of his novel. In 1983 a story featuring the character entitled Mawrdew Czgowchwz in Dublin was published in the Summer issue of The Paris Review. In 2007 he published a sequel to the novel entitled Now Voyager.

References

1975 American novels
1975 debut novels
NYRB Classics
Farrar, Straus and Giroux books